And This is Them was a short-lived radio program that aired from November 1999-December 1999.  There were seven half-hour episodes and it was broadcast on BBC Radio 2.  It starred Sean Hughes.

Notes and references
Lavalie, John. "And This is Them." EpGuides. 21 Jul 2005. 29 Jul 2005  <https://web.archive.org/web/20070814195327/http://www.epguides.com/AndThisisThem/%3E.

BBC Radio 2 programmes